Ali & Gipp was an American hip hop duo which consisted of St. Louis-based recording artist Ali Jones of St. Lunatics and Atlanta-based recording artist Big Gipp (real name Cameron Gipp) of Goodie Mob. They first appeared together on the single "Grillz" by Nelly featuring Paul Wall, which reached number one on the Billboard Hot 100. They released their only album, Kinfolk, on August 14, 2007.

Discography

Albums

Singles

References

External links
 Official site
 Ali & Gipp's Myspace

American hip hop groups
American musical duos
Hip hop duos
Universal Motown Records artists
Republic Records artists